Xerorchis (from Greek xeros, dry, and orchis, testicle-shaped) is an orchid genus in the subfamily Epidendroideae, and the sole representative of tribe Xerorchideae. This is a very primitive genus consisting of terrestrial orchids. Xerorchis thrives in South America.

Taxonomy
It is unclear whether this genus should be classified in the lower or higher epidendroids.

Xerorchis has 8 pollinia, hence similar to the more advanced epidendroid genera of Epidendreae and Arethuseae. Yet its morphology, with unthickened stems and persistent leaves, is that of a bambusoid grass and makes it more similar to Tropidieae or Triphoreae.

References

Xerorchideae genera
Xerorchideae